Chihr-Burzen, also known as Simah-i Burzin, was an Iranian nobleman from the House of Karen, who served as the Sasanian spahbed of Khorasan.

Biography
Chihr-Burzen was the son of the powerful Sasanian noble Sukhra, and had 8 other brothers, which included the prominent nobleman Bozorgmehr. Chihr-Burzen is first mentioned during the reign of Khosrau I, as one of the elites and most prominent men of the Empire. He, along with two other powerful magnates named Izadgushasp and Bahram-i Mah Adhar, were asked by Khosrau I to choose his successor. The family of Chihr-Burzen, including many other prominent aristocracy families, eventually elected Khosrau's son Hormizd as the heir of the Empire. In 579, Khosrau was succeeded by his son Hormizd IV, who removed Chihr-Burzen as the spahbed of Khorasan and replaced him with his brother Bozorgmehr. During the 580's, Hormizd ordered the death of 13,600 nobles and religious members, which included Chihr-Burzen.

References

Sources

6th-century births
580s deaths
6th-century Iranian people
Executed military personnel
House of Karen
People executed by the Sasanian Empire
Spahbeds
Generals of Khosrow I